Colubrina is a genus of about 30 species of flowering plants in the family Rhamnaceae, native to warm temperate to tropical regions of Africa, the Americas, southern Asia, northern Australia, and the Indian Ocean islands.

Names 
Common names include nakedwood, snakewood, greenheart and hogplum.  The generic name is derived from the Latin word coluber, meaning "snake", and refers to the snake-like stems or stamens.

Description 
The flowers are small, greenish-white or yellowish; the fruit is a capsule containing three seeds.

Taxonomy 
The genus is at least in part a wastebasket taxon, and revision will likely result in the renaming of a number of species to different genera in the future.

Selected species 
Colubrina angustior (M.C.Johnst.) G.L.Nesom (eastern Mexico)
Colubrina arborescens (Mill.) Sarg. – Greenheart (southern Florida, southern Mexico, the Caribbean, Central America)
Colubrina articulata (Capuron) Figueiredo
Colubrina asiatica (L.) Brongn. – Asian nakedwood, Ānapanapa kukuku (Hawaiian) (Indo-Pacific)
Colubrina beccariana Warb. (Malaysia)
Colubrina californica I.M.Johnst. – Las Animas nakedwood
Colubrina cubensis (Jacq.) Brongn. – Cuban nakedwood (southern Florida, The Bahamas, Cayman Islands, Cuba)
Colubrina decipiens (Baill.) Capuron
Colubrina elliptica (Sw.) Brizicky & W.L.Stern – mabi, soldierwood (Florida Keys, Mexico, the Caribbean, Central America, Venezuela)
Colubrina ferruginosa Brongn.
Colubrina glandulosa Perkins – glandular nakedwood
Colubrina greggii S.Watson – Sierra nakedwood
Colubrina humbertii (H.Perrier) Capuron
Colubrina nicholsonii Van Wyk & Schrire – Pondo snakewood, Pondo weeping thorn, 
Colubrina oppositifolia Brongn. ex H.Mann – kauila (Hawaii)
Colubrina pedunculata Baker f. (Christmas Island)
Colubrina pubescens Kurz
Colubrina stricta Engelm. ex M.C. Johnst. – Comal nakedwood
Colubrina texensis (Torr. & A.Gray) A.Gray – snakewood or Texan hogplum (Texas, northern Mexico)
Colubrina verrucosa (Urb.) M.C.Johnst. – Urban's nakedwood
Colubrina yucatanensis (M.C.Johnst.) G.L.Nesom (Yucatán Peninsula)

Formerly placed here
 Alphitonia excelsa (Fenzl) Reissek ex Benth. (as C. excelsa Fenzl)

Ecology
Colubrina species are used as food plants by the larvae of some Lepidoptera species including Bucculatrix kendalli which feeds exclusively on C. texensis. Colubrina asiatica, native to tropical Asia, eastern Africa and northern Australia, has become an invasive species in Florida.

Uses
In the Caribbean, the leaves and/or fruit and in some cases the bark of some species are used to produce a soft drink called mauby.

References

External links

USDA Plants Profile: Colubrina
Madagascar Flora catalogue: Colubrina
Flora of China: Colubrina checklist
Global Invasive Species Database: Colubrina asiatica
Jepson Flora Project: Colubrina californica

 
Rhamnaceae genera
Taxa named by Adolphe-Théodore Brongniart
Taxa named by Louis Claude Richard